Calosoma lariversi is a species of ground beetle in the subfamily of Carabinae. It was described by Van Dyke in 1943.

References

lariversi
Beetles described in 1943